Hymenolepis tualatinensis a species of parasitic cestodes (tapeworms), in the genus Hymenolepis.  It was originally described in 1985 from the gastrointestinal tract of the Camas pocket gopher (Thomomys bulbivorus).

References

Cestoda